The Assets Examination Committee (Thai: คณะกรรมการตรวจสอบการกระทำที่ก่อให้เกิดความเสียหายแก่รัฐ; RTGS: Khana Kammakan Truat Sop Kan Kratham Thi Ko Hai Koet Khwam Sia Hai Kae Rat, Literal Meaning: the Committee for Inspection of Acts being Detrimental to the State), abbreviated as AEC (Thai: คตส., RTGS: khotoso), sometimes translated as the Assets Scrutiny Committee or ASC, is a now-defunct Thai administrative body in charge of scrutiny of assets of the ministers in the government of Pol Lt Col Thaksin Shinawatra. The Council for National Security, a military junta that overthrew Thaksin's government in 2006, accused those ministers of having gained assets in a manner against the law or detrimental to the state. They set up the AEC in response.

Members 
 Nam Yimyaem (นาม ยิ้มแย้ม), chairperson
 Instructor Kaewsan Atibhoti (แก้วสรรค์ อติโพธิ), member and secretary
 Sak Kosaengrueang (สัก กอแสงเรือง), member and spokesman
 Klanarong Chanthik (กล้านรงค์ จันทิก), member
 Khunying Jaruvan Maintaka (จารุวรรณ เมณฑกา), member
 Chiranit Hawanon (จิรนิติ หะวานนท์), member
 Assoc Prof Banjerd Singkaneti (บรรเจิด สิงคะเนติ ), member
 Prof Wirot Laohaphan (วิโรจน์ เลาหะพันธุ์ ), member
 Sawat Chotiphanit (สวัสดิ์ โชติพานิช), member (later resigned)
 Prof Saowani Atsawarot (เสาวนีย์ อัศวโรจน์), member
 Udom Fueangfung (อุดม เฟื่องฟุ้ง), member
 Amnuai Thanthara (อำนวย ธันธรา), member

Powers and duties 
The AEC's powers and duties were:
 To inspect any performance or project as approved or consented by any person in the Council of Ministers or by the Council of Ministers vacating office by the result of the democratic reform if there is a ground to suspect that it was carried out corruptly or dishonestly
 To inspect any contract, concession or procurement of any government agency, state enterprise or other state agencies if there are grounds to suspect that it rendered illegal benefit to any private individual or it constituted illegal act or corruption or dishonest behaviour
 To inspect any performance of duties of any state official or state agency if there are grounds to suspect that there is a commission of illegal act or corruption or dishonest behavior
 To inspect any act of any person if it is of opinion that such act is illegal or avoiding of duties under the law on taxation and revenue which may be detrimental to the state.

See also 
 Potjaman Shinawatra
 Politics of Thailand
 Council for Democratic Reform
 Council for National Security
 2006 Thai coup d'état

References

External links
 https://web.archive.org/web/20061004002649/http://www.mict.go.th/cdrc/read.asp?id=8174&cid=1&search=
 https://web.archive.org/web/20061004011358/http://www.mict.go.th/cdrc/read.asp?id=8107&cid=1&search=

Defunct government agencies of Thailand
Corruption in Thailand